Raden Wijaya or Raden Vijaya (also known as Nararya Sangramawijaya, regnal name Kertarajasa Jayawardhana) (reigned 1293–1309) was a Javanese emperor, and the founder and first monarch of the Majapahit Empire. The history of his founding of Majapahit was written in several records, including Pararaton and Negarakertagama. His rule was marked by the victory against the army and the Mongol navy of Kublai Khan's Yuan dynasty.

Ancestry

There are several versions of his ancestry.

According to Pararaton, Raden Wijaya was the son of Mahisa Campaka, prince of Singhasari.

According to later controversial source from 17th century, Pustaka Rajyarajya i Bhumi Nusantara, Raden Wijaya was the son of Rakeyan Jayadarma (son of Sunda-Galuh King Prabu Guru Darmasiksa) and Dyah Lembu Tal (daughter of Mahisa Campaka from Singhasari). Rakeyan Jayadarma was poisoned and after her husband's death, Dyah Lembu Tal returned from Sunda-Galuh Kingdom to Singhasari with Raden Wijaya. This story is similar to that of Babad Tanah Jawi which mentioned the founder of Majapahit was Jaka Sesuruh, a son from the king of Pajajaran's which is located in Sunda Kingdom. Jaka Sesuruh ran to the east because of a rivalry with his step brother Siyung Wanara.

Alternatively with Nagarakretagama, Dyah Lembu Tal, also known as Dyah Singhamurti, was a man and the great-grandson of Ken Arok, king of Singhasari (1222–1227) and Ken Dedes, by their son Mahisa Wonga Teleng, and his son Mahisa Campaka (Nara Singhamurti). Because Nagarakretagama was written in 1365, 56 years since the Raden Wijaya's death, popular opinion supports it.

Prior to the founding of Majapahit
In 1289, Kublai Khan sent a demand for tribute to the Kingdom of Singhasari, although the demand was refused by Kertanagara, King of Singhasari and the messenger was humiliated with his ear cut off. Shortly after, there was a rebellion against Singhasari in the duchy of Gelang-Gelang (modern-day Madiun) led by Jayakatwang. Kertanagara was killed in the attempt to put down the rebellion in 1292, and Raden Wijaya fled to Sumenep, Madura, along with the governor of that region, Aria Wiraraja. There, Raden Wijaya made a plan to establish a new kingdom. Wijaya promised that he would divide Java with Aria Wiraraja if Aria Wiraraja could help him overthrow Jayakatwang's Kediri kingdom.

Wiraraja's son Ranggalawe served as one of Wijaya's senapati (warlord) but in later days he would rebel against the new king. Other famous officers were Lembu Sora and Nambi, both also rebelled against Wijaya respectively after the founding of Majapahit kingdom.

Foundation of the Majapahit kingdom
In November 1292, a Mongol force landed in Tuban, East Java, with the aim of revenge for Kertanagara's humiliation of the Mongol messenger. However, Kertanegara was already dead. Raden Wijaya initially made an alliance with the Mongols with the aim of attacking Kediri, which had become the strongest country in Java. Jayakatwang was defeated and destroyed in 1293, at which point Raden Wijaya turned and attacked the Mongol force.  The Mongols, already weakened by tropical diseases, the climate, and imperial overreach, were forced to flee Java. Raden Vijaya then established the Majapahit kingdom, taking the title Kritarajasa Jayavardhana.

Personal life
According to George Coedes, prior to the fall of Singhasari, Wijaya was married to Gayatri Rajapatni, the daughter of Kertanegara, King of Singhasari. However, during the formation of the new kingdom Majapahit, he married the four daughters of Kertanegara. 

The siblings were Parameswari Tribhuwana the oldest, Prajnaparamitha, Narendra Duhita, and Gayatri Rajapatni the youngest. The reasons of Raden Wijaya's practice of siblings polygamy was to ensure his claim of legitimacy, also to prevent the contest for Kertanegara's Singhasari legacy. Raden Wijaya also took Indreswari (also known as Dara Petak), supposedly a princess of Malayu Dharmasraya Kingdom brought by Kebo Anabrang to Majapahit court from Sumatra through Kertanegara's Pamalayu expedition. Pararaton mentioned that Kala Gemet was born by Dara Petak, the Dharmasraya princess, while Nagarakretagama mentioned that he was born by Indreswari, leading to assumption that Indreswari was another name of Dara Petak. King Kertarajasa Jayawardhana has five wives, however in his posthumous portrayal as the god Harihara in Simping temple, his image was flanked by two female figures, suggested that he has two pramesvari (queen consort), one is Gayatri, the other is Tribhuwana or probably Dara Petak.

Spouses and Children 
Queen
 Rajapatni Shri Rajendra Dyah Devi Gayatrithe youngest daughter of King Kertanegara of Singhasari
 Shri Paramesvari Dyah Devi Tribhuvanesvarithe eldest daughter of King Kertanegara of Singhasari
Consort
 Shri Mahadevi Dyah Devi Narendraduhitadaughter of King Kertanegara of Singhasari
 Shri Jayendra Dyah Devi Prajña Paramitadaughter of King Kertanegara of Singhasari
 Shri Indresvariborn as Dara Petak, daughter of King Srimat Tribhuvanaraja Mauliavarmadeva of Dharmasraya
Children
 Tribhuvana, 3rd Queen of Majapahitborn as Dyah Gitarja, daughter of Gayatri
 Jayanagara, 2nd King of Majapahitson of Dara Petak
 Rajadevi Maharajasa, Duchess of Dahaborn as Dyah Viyat, daughter of Gayatri

Rule of Majapahit
Raden Wijaya was known as a firm and capable ruler. Aria Wiraraja who had been so useful during the period of the establishment of the kingdom, was given Madura, which was granted a special status. He was also given an autonomous region around Lumajang and the Blambangan Peninsula, and his son, Nambi, was appointed Prime Minister. Raden Wijaya also formed a special army guard for the king which consists of 7 people named Ra Kuti, Ra Semi, Ra Tanca, Ra Wedeng, Ra Yuyu, Ra Banyak, and Ra Pangsa

Heir
From his wife Indreswari, Raden Wijaya had a son, Dyah Jayanegara. From his wife Gayatri Rajapatni, he had two daughters, Tribhuwana Wijayatunggadewi and Rajadewi. Other wives seemed to be childless, including his first wife, Tribhuwana. 

After his death, Raden Wijaya was succeeded by his son, Jayanegara.

Death
According to the Nagarakretagama, King Wijaya died in 1309. He was buried in the Simping Temple (id) as "Harihara", the combination of Vishnu and Shiva.

He was succeeded by his son Jayanegara.

See also
 Senapati of Mataram, the founder and first king of Mataram Sultanate was a descendant of Raden Wijaya

References

Kings of Majapahit
Indonesian Hindu monarchs
Majapahit
13th-century monarchs in Asia
14th-century monarchs in Asia
13th-century Indonesian people
14th-century Indonesian people
1309 deaths
13th-century Hindus
14th-century Hindus